Kalateh-ye Baba (also Romanized as Kalāteh-ye Bābā; also known as Kalāteh-ye Bābā’ī) is a village in Baqeran Rural District, in the Central District of Birjand County, South Khorasan Province, Iran. In the 2006 census, its population was recorded as being 10 people, in 5 families.

References 

Populated places in Birjand County